The Wooden O Symposium is a cross disciplinary conference exploring Medieval, Renaissance, and Early Modern Studies, through the study and performance of the works of William Shakespeare. Scholars from many disciplines present papers that offer insights and new ideas springing from the era of William Shakespeare.   His plays are replete with the language, thoughts and arts of the Renaissance and Western culture and represent an inexhaustible source for creative ideas and research.

Shakespeare Study
The symposium is hosted by Southern Utah University, home of the Tony Award-winning Utah Shakespearean Festival. A major focus of the scholarly event is the interface between scholarship and performance and how the pursuit of one area can enrich and inform the other.

The Festival is noted for the Adams Memorial Theater, a beautiful open air performance space modeled after Shakespeare's own Globe Theatre, the original "wooden O."

Schedule
This academic conference takes place every year in Cedar City, Utah and runs the first Monday through Wednesday of August.

External links
 Wooden O Symposium -- Official Web site
 Utah Shakespearean Festival -- Official Web site

Academic conferences
Iron County, Utah
Shakespearean scholarship